Nowell is the surname of:

Alexander Nowell (1507–1602), Anglican Puritan theologian and clergyman; dean of St Paul's
Andrew Nowell, English politician, MP for Rutland
Ben Nowell (born 1985), New Zealand rugby  player
Bradley Nowell (1968–1996), American musician, lead singer and guitarist of the ska punk band Sublime
Howard Wilbert Nowell (1872–1940), instructor in pathology at Boston University and  cancer researcher
Increase Nowell (1590–1655), colonial administrator, founder of Charlestown, Massachusetts
Jack Nowell (born 1993), rugby player
Jaylen Nowell (born 1999), American basketball player
Laurence Nowell (1530–1570), English antiquarian, cartographer and scholar  
Laurence Nowell (priest) (died 1576), English churchman, Archdeacon of Derby and Dean of Lichfield, cousin of the antiquary
Louis R. Nowell (1915–2009), Los Angeles fire captain and politician
Mel Nowell (born 1940), basketball player
Peter Nowell (born 1928), cancer researcher and professor
Thomas Nowell (1730?–1801), English clergyman, historian and religious controversialist
Wedgwood Nowell (1878–1957), American film actor

See also
Radulf Novell, 12th century Anglo-Norman prelate whose name is sometimes spelled "Robert Nowell"
Noel (surname)
Noll, surname
Knoll (surname)
Knowle (disambiguation), includes list of people with surname Knowle